Harem or Harim (also , identical Arabic spelling with haram), is a Syrian city within the Idlib Governorate. It has an altitude of 160 meters and a population of 21,934. Harem is situated on the border with Turkey, 55 km west of Aleppo.

History
The city lies along the route between Antioch and Aleppo, and has been around since the Byzantine era.

Harem Castle: Byzantines to Seljuks
There is an important castle in Harem which has been built in a unique military style. The castle was originally Byzantine and was built by Nikephoros II Phokas shortly after 959, it then fell to the Arabs and then to the Seljuk Turks.

Crusaders, Zengids and Ayyubids
In 1097, it was taken by the Crusaders, who kept it for the next forty years, except for a short time in 1098 when it was taken by the Muslim Arabs. After Nur al-Din's victory over Raymond of Poitiers at the Battle of Inab, the castle fell to Muslim forces in 1149. It was taken back by the Crusaders under Baldwin III in 1158. However, Nur al-Din besieged the castle once more in 1164. When the Crusaders attempted to relieve the siege, Nur al-Din defeated them decisively at the Battle of Harim, capturing many of the Christian leadership including Raymond III of Tripoli, Bohemond III of Antioch, Hugh VIII of Lusignan, and Joscelin III of Edessa. After this, the castle remained in Muslim hands for the remainder of the Crusader period, though Count Philip I of Flanders unsuccessfully attempted to recapture it one last time during his pilgrimage to the east in 1177. The Crusader castle was rebuilt by the son of Saladin, Malik Al Zaher Ghazi.

Mongol destruction
When the Mongols led by Hulagu Khan invaded in 1260, much of Harem was destroyed including its castle, and its population was massacred. What is left of the castle dates back to the Muslim-Crusader wars between 1164 and 1268.

19th and 20th centuries
In the early 1800s, the Barmada family rebuild Harem after it was completely destroyed by the Mongols in the 13th century.

The landlords of Harem between the 1800s until 1963 belonged to four main families: Barmada, Kayali, Al-Kikhia and Hananu.

In 1980, the Syrian government confiscated all the properties and lands of Barmada family.

Syrian Civil War
During the Syrian Civil War, the town remained loyal to the Syrian government led by Bashar al-Assad before surrendering to the Free Syrian Army in a two-month long battle in late 2012. By late 2014, Harem had become the local headquarters for the Islamist al-Nusra Front.

On 24 January 2016, Ahrar ash-Sham expelled al-Nusra Front from the Syrian town of Harem, after tensions between the two groups boiled over. Subsequent clashes erupted in the nearby town of Salqin.

2023 Earthquake 
In early February 2023, an earthquake devasted southern Turkey and adjacent Northern Syria. Harem was particularly hard-hit, with hundreds killed, and received little to no international aid.

Climate
Due to Harem's location being very close to Aleppo, the climate is very similar.
Below is the climate table for Aleppo, because there is no climate data concerning Harem.

References

Bibliography

Cities in Syria
Populated places in Harem District
Crusader castles